Indian Valley Reservoir is a man-made lake in Lake County, California,  west of Williams near State Route 20.

The   capacity reservoir was created by the construction of the Indian Valley Dam across the north fork of Cache Creek in 1975.
The dam includes a hydroelectric plant. The cost of the dam and reservoir exceeded $9 million and were funded in part by two bond issues.

Recreation area
The reservoir is in the Bureau of Land Management's Walker Ridge Recreation Area. All types of recreation are allowed, including boating, camping, fishing, hunting, hiking, bicycling and horseback riding.

There are two primitive boat/hike-in campgrounds, Blue Oaks and Kowalski.

The area's flora and fauna include manzanita, oak and pine trees, blacktail deer, black bear, and wild turkey.  Rare plants such as the  Indian Valley Brodiaea and Adobe lily grow here.

See also
List of dams and reservoirs in California
List of lakes in California
List of lakes in Lake County, California
List of largest reservoirs of California
List of power stations in California

References

External links
1970 Video presentation by the Yolo County Water Resources Board proposing this Indian Valley project.
 BLM webpage on Indian Valley area.
History essay on water rights, Lake County.

Reservoirs in Lake County, California
Reservoirs in California
Reservoirs in Northern California